Jamu (Van Ophuijsen Spelling: Djamoe;) is a traditional medicine from Indonesia. It is predominantly a herbal medicine made from natural materials, such as roots, bark, flowers, seeds, leaves and fruits. Materials acquired from animals, such as honey, royal jelly, milk and native chicken eggs are often used as well.

In 2019, jamu was officially recognized as one of Indonesia's intangible cultural heritage by the Indonesian Ministry of Education and Culture.

Jamu can be found throughout Indonesia, however it is most prevalent in Java, where Mbok Jamu, the traditional kain kebaya-wearing young to middle-aged Javanese woman carrying bamboo basket, filled with bottles of jamu on her back, travelling villages and towns alleys, offering her fares of traditional herbal medicine, can be found. In many large cities jamu herbal medicine is sold on the street by hawkers carry a refreshing drink, usually bitter but sweetened with honey or palm sugar.

Herbal medicine is also produced in factories by large companies such as Air Mancur, Djamu Djago or Sido Muncul, and sold at various drug stores in sachet packaging. Packaged dried jamu should be dissolved in hot water first before drinking. Nowadays herbal medicine is also sold in the form of tablets, caplets and capsules. These jamu brands are united in an Indonesian Herbal and Traditional Medicine Association, locally known as Gabungan Pengusaha Jamu (GP Jamu). Today, jamu is a growing local herbal medicine industry worth millions of dollars. In 2014, jamu contributed Rp 3 trillion (US$73.29 million) to overall sales.

Etymology
The word  is Javanese in origin. It derived from the Javanese words that consist of  refers to "Javanese" or "Java", and  means "mixing" or "gathering" (the ingredients). Thus can be roughly translated as "the concoction made by the Javanese" or "the concoction originated from Java".

It is believed that  initially used by dukuns as one of the spiritual requirements (especially for black magic practices).

Traditional production centers

Despite jamu's popularity throughout Indonesia, it seems that jamu culture is most prevalent in Java. The jamu herbal culture is prevalent in Javanese royal courts of Yogyakarta and Surakarta, where the ancient books on herbal medicine is kept in royal library, and jamu medicine is prescribes to royalties and nobles in Javanese keratons. According to Javanese tradition, the famed beauty of putri keraton (princess and palace ladies) are owed to jamu and lulur (traditional lotion).

Sukoharjo in Central Java in particular is believed to be one of the center of jamu tradition. Many of the Mbok Jamu jamu sellers ladies are hailed from this town. The traditional jamu herbal traders in Sukoharjo has established the statue of jamu seller as Sukoharjo's identity in Bulakrejo. Commonly called "jamu herbal seller statue" it depicts a farmer and a jamu gendong herbalist carrying her wares. Sukoharjo regions, particularly sub-district Nguter, is known as the place of origin of Mbok Jamu gendong herbalist in many big cities, such as Jakarta, Bandung, Bogor, and Surabaya.

History

Jamu is believed to have originated in the Mataram Kingdom era,  1300 years ago. The stone mortar and pestle with long cylindrical stone mortar — the type commonly used in today's traditional jamu making, was discovered in Liyangan archaeological site on the slopes of Mount Sundoro, Central Java. The site and relics are dated from Mataram Kingdom era circa 8th to 10th century, which suggest that the herbal medicine tradition of jamu had already taken hold by then. The bas-reliefs on Borobudur depict images of people grinding something with stone mortar and pestle, drink sellers, physicians and masseuse treating their clients. All of these scenes might be interpreted as a traditional herbal medicine and health-related treatments in ancient Java. The Madhawapura inscription from Majapahit period mentioned a specific profession of herb mixer and combiner (herbalist), called Acaraki. The medicine book from Mataram dated from circa 1700 contains 3,000 entries of jamu recipes, while Javanese classical literature Serat Centhini (1814) describes some jamu herbal concoction recipes.

Though heavily influenced by Ayurveda from India, Indonesia is a vast archipelago with numerous indigenous plants not found in India, and include plants similar to Australia beyond the Wallace Line. Jamu may vary from region to region, and the recipes often not written down, especially in remote areas of the country.

Jamu was (and still) practiced as one of the spiritual requirements of the indigenous physicians (dukuns). However, it is generally prepared and prescribed by women, who sell it on the streets. Generally, the different jamu prescriptions are not written down but handed down between the generations. Some early handbooks, however, have survived. A jamu handbook that was used in households throughout the Dutch East Indies (present-day Indonesia) was published in 1911 by Mrs. Kloppenburg-Versteegh.

One of the first European physicians to study jamu was Jacobus Bontius (Jacob de Bondt), who was a physician in Batavia (present-day Jakarta) in the early seventeenth century. His writings contain information about indigenous medicine of Java. A comprehensive book on indigenous herbal medicine in the Dutch East Indies (present-day Indonesia) was published by Rumphius, who worked in Ambon during early eighteenth century. He published a book called Herbaria Amboinesis (The Ambonese Spice Book). During the nineteenth century, European physicians had a keen interest in jamu, as they often did not know how to treat the diseases they encountered in their patients in the Dutch East Indies (present-day Indonesia). The German physician Carl Waitz published on jamu in 1829. In the 1880s and 1890s, A.G. Vorderman published extensive accounts on jamu as well. Pharmacological research on herbal medicine was undertaken by M. Greshoff and W.G. Boorsma at the pharmacological laboratory at the Bogor Botanical Garden

Popularity

Indonesian physicians were initially not very interested in jamu. During the second conference of the Indonesian Association of Physicians, held in Solo in March 1940, two presentations on the topic were given. During the Japanese occupation, Indonesia's Jamu Committee was formed in 1944. During the following decades, the popularity of jamu increased, although physicians had rather ambivalent opinions about it.

Indonesia—home to highly diversified herbs products—expects domestic sales of herbal and traditional medicine, including food supplements and cosmetics, to expand by 15 percent by 2014 to Rp 15 trillion (US$1.23 billion) compared to 2013, due to its increasingly health-conscious middle-income bracket, according to the Indonesian Herbal and Traditional Medicine Association (Gabungan Pengusaha Jamu/GP Jamu). Jamu contributes Rp 3 trillion (US$73.29 million) to overall sales.

Several Indonesian leading figures are known as the endorser of jamu herbal products, including former first lady Tien Soeharto, business figures Mooryati Soedibyo and Jaya Suprana, and President Joko Widodo. Joko admitted that he had consumed the herbal medicine, locally known as temulawak jahe (the mixture of ginger and curcuma) for 17 years which he believed has helped him in his daily activities as well as to repair the liver and digestive functions.

Form
Jamu is often distributed in the form of powder, pills, capsules, and drinking liquid. Jamu shops, which sell only ingredients or prepare the jamu on spot as required by buyers, as well as women roaming the street to sell jamu, is a commonly seen way to distribute jamu in Indonesia. Nowadays, jamu is also mass manufactured and exported. There are often concerns as to quality, consistency, and cleanliness in not only the locally distributed but also manufactured forms.

Quasi-health

There are a few quasi-health related uses for jamu, for example curiously promoted to enhance sexual pleasure, but also traditionally manage post childbirth trauma.  There are kinds of jamu to increase sexual stamina for men, as well as others to tighten the vagina for women (with names like Sari Rapat ("Essence of Tightness"), Rapat Wangi ("Tight and Fragrant"), and even Empot Ayam ("Tight as a Chicken's Anus"). Some exported to far as Kenya under names Tongkat ajimat madura, or madura sticks. See also hee yum grass (thai herbalism).

Herbs for jamu
There are hundreds of herbs for jamu prescriptions, some are:

Rhizomes:
Bengle (Zingiber brevifolium)
Jahe Ginger (Zingiber officinale)
Kencur Aromatic Galangal (Kaempferia galanga)
Kunyit Turmeric (Curcuma domestica)
Lempuyang (Zingiber zerumbet or Zingiber aromaticum)
Lengkuas or Laos Greater Galangal (Alpinia galanga)
Temulawak (Curcuma xanthorrhiza)
Leaves:
Brotowali or bratawali (Tinospora crispa or Tinospora tuberculata rumphii)
Sambang Darah (Excoecaria cochinchinensis or Excoecaria bicolor)
Secang (Caesalpinia sappan)
Seeds:
Adas (Foeniculum vulgare Mill)
Fruits:
Asam Jawa tamarind (Tamarindus indica)
Ceplukan Cutleaf groundcherry (Physalis angulata)
Jeruk Nipis Key lime (Citrus aurantifolia Swingle)
Nyamplung or kosambi (Calophyllum inophyllum)
Barks
Kayu Manis Cinnamon (Cinnamomum burmannii)
Flowers
Ilang-ilang Ylang ylang (Cananga odorata)
Melati Jasmine (Jasminum sambac)
Rumput Alang-alang (Gramineae)

Non-herbal elements of jamu
Non-herbal materials acquired from animals are also often used in jamu mixture. Among others are:
Insects
Honey
Royal jelly
Bee larvae
Certain types of insects, including larvae
Ant nest
Cattles and dairy product
Milks from various species, includes cow, buffalo, goat and horse
Goat's bile
Poultry
ayam kampung eggs
Sea creatures
Dried seahorse
Dried sea cucumber

See also
 Ramuan

Further reading

References

Traditional medicine
Medicine in Indonesia
Indonesian culture